Kim Bo-mi (김보미, born 7 October 1985) is a South Korean field hockey player. She competed for the South Korea women's national field hockey team at the 2016 Summer Olympics.

References

1985 births
Living people
South Korean female field hockey players
Asian Games medalists in field hockey
Asian Games silver medalists for South Korea
Field hockey players at the 2010 Asian Games
Field hockey players at the 2016 Summer Olympics
Field hockey players at the 2018 Asian Games
Medalists at the 2010 Asian Games
Olympic field hockey players of South Korea
People from Mokpo
Sportspeople from South Jeolla Province
20th-century South Korean women
21st-century South Korean women